The National Defence Volunteer Forces or NDVF ( [], previously  []) is a branch of the Lithuanian Armed Forces. Volunteer forces were officially established on 17 January 1991 by the law of the Supreme Council of Lithuania on the National Defence Volunteer Service providing basis for establishing Voluntary National Defence Service. This decision made legal already existing volunteer formations that began appearing as early as 1990. Voluntary National Defence Service was reorganised into the National Defence Volunteer Force.  In 2003 Volunteer Force was integrated into the Lithuanian Land Force. Tasks of volunteer soldiers were inevitably altered when Lithuania became a full-fledged member of NATO: approach of territorial defence was changed into territorial defence and training of modern active reserve. There are around 5000 volunteers and around 800 professional soldiers in the force.

History

Origins
The NDVF's history is somewhat linked to the Lithuanian Riflemen's Union, which was the largest self-defence forces organization with official status in Lithuania before the Soviet occupation in 1940.

During 1991 all units of the National Defence System were formed on a voluntary basis.

On 11 January 1991 several hundred of the Parliament defenders took an oath of allegiance to the Republic of Lithuania and with support from the public began preparing for a possible attack against the Lithuanian Supreme Council building (presently the Parliament of Lithuania). Other volunteers joined units to protect facilities of the Press Palace, Vilnius Television Tower, and other strategic assets when the Soviet Union was attempting to overthrow the legal government of Lithuania and reintroduce an occupational regime in January 1991.

On 17 January 1991 the Supreme Council of the Republic of Lithuania passed the law on the National Defence Volunteer Service, which became the basis for the establishment of the then Voluntary National Defence Service (VNDS).

In March 1991 the VNDS staff, an operational platoon, the VNDS Training Centre were formed as well as 200 company-size units were organized into eight territorial defence regions. In accordance with an order issued by Director General of Department of National Defence, Colonel Jonas Gečas was appointed as the Chief of Staff of the Voluntary National Defence Service.

Events during the 1991 Soviet Coup
During the 1991 Soviet coup d'état attempt, volunteer serviceman Artūras Sakalauskas lost his life in the line of duty when defending the Lithuanian Supreme Council on 21 August.

Once the coup d'état was defeated, NDVS units received an order to block the Soviet forces in order to prevent them from bringing replacement troops from Russia into Lithuania. At that time forty-four guard posts were installed where 201 NDVS members would simultaneously stand on duty. At the end of 1991, the Volunteer Forces embarked upon the protection of national strategic assets.

Current Duties

Volunteer units provided support to civilian authorities in the event of natural or industrial disasters. In the summer of 1992, thousands of volunteers assisted in fighting fires in wooded areas and peat lands; they participated in cleaning hazardous spill on the Nemunas River subsequent to an ecological disaster in Belarus. They also took part in relief activities during the flood of the Nemunas Delta in the Western part of Lithuania. In 1993, during a visit of Pope John Paul II to Lithuania, thousands of volunteers helped the police maintain public order.

The Volunteer units took part in the first military exercises organised by the Lithuanian Armed Forces including the first joint military exercises Safeguard '93, Wind of Spring (1997–1998), Baltic Challenge (1998), Amber Hope series.

Starting in 1994 members of the Volunteer Forces began participating international peacekeeping missions.

In 1998 the Voluntary National Defence Service (SKAT in Lithuanian) was reorganised as the National Defence Volunteer Forces, KASP – in Lithuanian) and became an integral part of the Lithuanian Armed Forces.

Structural Changes

Since 2004 the Lithuanian Grand Duke Butigeidis Dragoon Battalion has been assigned to the Volunteer Forces.

On 1 July 2005 the 9th Territorial Unit of the Kęstutis Military District of the Volunteer Force was restructured. The force units and members have been placed under the control of the 3rd Territorial Unit of the Žemaičiai military District and the 2nd Territorial Unit of Darius and Girėnas Military District.

On 1 September 2005 the 4th Territorial Unit of Tauras Military District was restructured. The force units and member have been placed under subordination of the 1st Territorial Unit of Dainava Military District and the 2nd Territorial Unit of Darius and Girėnas Military District.

Structure 
The structure of the NDVF is as follows:
 1st Territorial Unit Dainava Military District, Alytus;
 2nd Territorial Unit Darius and Girėnas Military District, Kaunas;
 3rd Territorial Unit Žemaičiai Military District, Klaipėda;
 5th Territorial Unit Vytis Military District, Panevėžys;
 6th Territorial Unit Prisikėlimo Military District, Šiauliai;
 8th Territorial Unit Didžioji Kova Military District, Vilnius;

Functions 
Tasks of the NDVF are training volunteers and other members of active reserve, units of NDVF for conducting territorial and collective defence tasks, preparing and participating in international operations, guarding important objects of defence infrastructure, state and municipal administration, and render assistance in case of natural disasters and catastrophes.

provide trained personnel for regular units of the Lithuanian Armed Forces, by transferring them to a higher readiness level or deployment to multinational operations;
prepares specialists of various fields and infantry units of up to company size for international deployment;
participates in providing host nation support to NATO or the Allied forces;
conducts peacetime tasks defined in legislation;
plans and conducts warfare training of volunteer soldiers;
develops cooperation with corresponding organisations in other countries regarding matters of warfare training of NDVF;
provides support for governmental and municipal institutions according to the order set by legal acts;
performs tasks of guarding vital objects of defence infrastructure, state and municipalities;
represents Lithuanian Armed Forces in the community: strengthens connection between the community and the armed forces, organises and conducts military patriotic education of youth, maintains close relations with local community, participates in public life, festivals and events within its scope;
is responsible for delivering technical provision and supplies for subordinate units, controls consumption of supplies;
organises maintenance, and effective and economical usage according to the purpose of the NDVF military and other equipment and other assets;
trains soldiers of NDVF and provides them with appropriate service conditions;
Performs other functions related to the tasks of NDVF if so designated by laws or other legal acts.

Equipment

 Colt M1911
 Heckler & Koch G36 KA
 AK 4MT
 FN SCAR
 /  M14 L1
 FN MAG
 MG 3
 M72 LAW
 Carl Gustav
 AT4
 Mercedes Benz 1213
 Mercedes Benz GD
 Unimog 4x4

References

Sources 
 Ministry of National Defence Republic of Lithuania
 Military of Lithuania

Lithuanian Land Force
1991 establishments in Lithuania
Military units and formations established in 1991
Military units and formations of Lithuania